"Say It" is the debut single by Canadian rapper Tory Lanez. The song was released on July 15, 2015 by Mad Love Records and Interscope Records. It is from his debut studio album, I Told You (2016). A snippet of the song was released on July 24, 2015. The song is another release under the Fargo Fridays series. It samples the song "If You Love Me" by Brownstone.

Music video
The song's accompanying music video premiered on August 10, 2015 on Tory's Vevo account on YouTube & features former Vine star Wolf Tyla. Since its release, the video has received over 280 million views.

Critical reception
"Say It" received positive reviews from music critics. Rick Florino of Artistdirect said, "...the new track sees him confidently embrace this inimitable and infectious style. It's airy drip transfixes just before building into an undeniable refrain. Somewhere between The Weeknd's nocturnal decadence and Future's space ruckus, Tory Lanez rules supreme. It's ultimately enigmatic and engaging at every turn. However, you really just need to listen to it for yourself."

Remix and cover
Sevyn Streeter released a remix of the song, with lyric changes. Ed Sheeran released a cover on SoundCloud.
Tory revealed Kanye West's team reached out for the instrumental to record a remix of the song, but the remix has yet to be released. Fifth Harmony's Normani Kordei also released a cover of the song.

Charts

Weekly charts

Year-end charts

Certifications

References

External links

2015 debut singles
2015 songs
Interscope Records singles
Songs written by Pop Wansel
Song recordings produced by Pop & Oak
Tory Lanez songs
Songs written by Gordon Chambers
Songs written by Dave Hall (record producer)
Songs written by Tory Lanez